Louise Wright (born 5 September 1863) was a fashion illustrator. Four of her six siblings were also professional artists. They were all born in Leeds, and almost all of them later moved to London.

Biography
Wright was born in Leeds, Yorkshire, England, on 5 September 1863, and baptised in Holbeck Parish, Leeds, on 7 October 1863. She is sometimes confused with the Louise Wright (b. 1875 Philadelphia, USA) who married John W. Wright (18571933), the watercolourist and etcher. 

Wright's father was George Edward Wright (24 February 183411 November 1916), an accountant and Elizabeth Scott (c. 184031 May 1916), the daughter or Thomas Scott (born c. 1804), variously a railway engineer and a commission agent. George Edward and Elizabeth had married on 22 August 1859 in St' Jude's Church at Hunslet, Leeds, Yorkshire, England.

George Edward Wright and Elizabeth Scott had seven children, five of whom were professional artists:
George Wright, (30 June 186011 March 1944) a noted painter of hunting and coaching scenes.
Louise Wright, the subject of this article.
Mabel Wright, born on 26 May 1867. One of only two siblings who were not professional artists. 
Ethel Wright, born 11 October 1870, was the second of the sibling who was not a professional artist. She was living with her sisteres at 131 Woodham lane in September 1939.
Constance Wright (5 March 1877second quarter of 1973), described as a fashion artist in the 1911 census.
Philip Wright, (c. 2 February 187811 July 1926), described as a fashion artist in the 1901 and the 1911 census.
Gilbert Scott Wright, (24 July 18801958), an artist who worked with his brother George in his early years and also painted sporting and coaching scenes. He served as executor for his brother Philip, and for his parents.

Wright seems never to have married. She was living at 131 Woodham Lane, Addlestone, Surrey at the time of the 1939 Register, at the house of her sister and brother-in-law, together with her sisters Ethel and Mabel. It is not clear when she died. The most likely record in the UK Death Index is a Louise Wright whose death was registered in North Surrey in the first quarter of 1944, aged 79. Louise would have been aged 80 at the time, but errors in such dates are not exceptional, especially as Louise's notional year of birth from Census data was 1868.

Work
Wright, like the rest of her family, had no formal training in art, and their abilities developed entirely on their professional needs. As a child, Wright spent most of her playtime designing dresses for her dolls. 
In 1891 the family was living at 6 Chestnut Ave, Headingley, in Leeds. However, there was little future there for the fashion illustrators in the family and the family moved to London. In 1901 the Family were living at 33 St. German's Road, Forest Hill, London. By 1911, Wright was living at Kirklees, 99 Honor Oak Park, with her parents, and her siblings Constance and Gilbert Scott.

Wright's first fashion work offered for sale was a series of watercolour designs for display in the windows of women's dress shops. This gained her an appointment as a designer for a costumier and soon after was offered commissions by Alfred Vivian Mansell & Co. for whom she produced her first fashion catalogue. Soon she was so busy that her brother Gilbert Scott Wright had to come to her assistance, and soon the whole family was engaged in fashion drawing.

Wright spent a year as the chief staff artist for Queen for a year.

Example of her work

The following illustrations are from The Art of the Illustrator. The first stage drawing is very faint as it was done in soft pencil and the ink may have faded over time.

Assessment
Wright was one of the leading illustrators selected by Percy Bradshaw for inclusion in his The Art of the Illustrator which presented a separate portfolio for each of twenty illustrators. The portfolio contained: a brief biography of Wright, an illustration of Wright at work in her studio, a sample of Wright's signature, an explanation of Wright's method of working-up the attached plates. The final plate showing an illustration typical of her work and five other plates showed the work at five earlier stages of its production, from the first rough to the just before the finished drawing or colour sketch. Wright's illustration is shown in the example above.

Bradshaw said that Louise and her siblings Wrights started the vogue for the beautifully illustrated Fashion Catalogues which have been issued by drapers, 
costumiers, tailors, etc., in recent years. and that this work kept the family perpetually busy. He further said that Wright had been responsible for a great deal of the best Fashion 
work which has been produced in this country and that her work was known and appreciated by users of Fashion drawing everywhere.

Notes

References

External links
The family home at the time of the 1911 Census on Google Streetview.

1863 births
Year of death missing
People from Leeds
English painters
English illustrators
English women painters